Kevin Carroll (born 6 September 1969) is an American actor, best known for his role as John Murphy in the HBO television series The Leftovers.

Career

Most recently, he appeared as Alton Williams on the FX series Snowfall and as the "Sinnerman," the main antagonist in season three of the FOX series Lucifer.

In 2018, he appeared in the Facebook Watch series Sacred Lies and in the feature film Blindspotting.

Filmography

Film

Television

References

External links
 

Living people
American male television actors
21st-century American male actors
Place of birth missing (living people)
1969 births